Uroš Veselič (born 20 May 1987 in Videm pri Ptuju) is a Slovenian footballer.

References
Profile at HLSZ 

1987 births
Living people
Slovenian footballers
Association football midfielders
Slovenian expatriate footballers
Expatriate footballers in Austria
SK Sturm Graz players
Slovenian expatriate sportspeople in Austria
NK Aluminij players
LASK players
NK Rudar Velenje players
Expatriate footballers in Hungary
Kecskeméti TE players
Slovenian expatriate sportspeople in Hungary
People from the Municipality of Videm